Aaron Younger (born 25 September 1991) is an Australian water polo player. 

He made his debut for the Australian national team in 2009, that year, he was also part of the Australian Universities team that won the World University Games. In 2010, he signed for the Hungarian team Szeged. 

At the 2012 Summer Olympics, he competed for the Australia men's national water polo team in the men's event - he was the youngest player on the team.  He also competed at the 2016 Summer Olympics, scoring seven goals in five games. In 2015, he signed for another Hungarian team, Szolnok, before moving to Ferencváros in 2018.  At the 2018 FINA Men's Water Polo World Cup, Aaron Younger was nominated best player of the tournament. 

Younger was picked to captain the Australian team in the men's water polo tournament at the 2020 Summer Olympics. Coached by  Elvis Fatović, the team finished joint fourth on points in their pool but their inferior goal average meant they finished fifth overall and out of medal contention. They were able to upset Croatia in a group stage match 11–8. Australia at the 2020 Summer Olympics details the results in depth.

He currently plays for Italian club Pro Recco. He has also represented Australia at five World Championships.  Original, he focussed on swimming but switched to water polo at the age of 10.  He has a Bachelor of Commerce from Curtin University and an MBA from the University of New South Wales.

Honours

Club 
Szolnok

LEN Champions League: 2016–17

LEN Super Cup: 2017

Hungarian Championship: 2015–16, 2016–17

Hungarian Cup: 2016–17, 2017–18
Hungarian Super Cup: 2017
Ferencvaros
LEN Champions League: 2018–19

LEN Super Cup: 2018, 2019
Hungarian Championship:  2018–19
Hungarian Cup: 2018–19, 2019–20
Hungarian Super Cup: 2018
Pro Recco
LEN Champions League: 2020–21, 2021–22
 LEN Super Cup: 2021
Serie A: 2021–22

Coppa Italia: 2020–21, 2021–22

Awards
 2015 World Championship Team of the Tournament
World Cup MVP: 2018 Berlin

References

External links
 

Australian male water polo players
1991 births
Living people
Olympic water polo players of Australia
Water polo players at the 2012 Summer Olympics
Water polo players at the 2016 Summer Olympics
Water polo players at the 2020 Summer Olympics